My Darling Clementine (Spanish: Mi adorada Clementina) is a 1953 Mexican comedy film directed by Rafael Baledón and starring Marga López, Joaquín Pardavé and Antonio Aguilar.

Cast
 Marga López as Clementina  
 Joaquín Pardavé as Don Carlos 
 Antonio Aguilar as Alfredo  
 Elda Peralta as Norma  
 Pedro de Aguillón as Doctor R. Obon  
 José Jasso as Gregorio  
 Leobardo Acosta
 Norma Ancira 
 León Barroso as Detective  
 Victorio Blanco as Invitada a fiesta 
 Ángel Merino 
 Irlanda Mora as Invitada a fiesta  
 Isaac Norton as Invitado a fiesta 
 José Pidal as Mayordomo  
 María Valdealde as Invitada a fiesta

References

Bibliography 
 María Luisa Amador. Cartelera cinematográfica, 1950-1959. UNAM, 1985.

External links 
 

1953 films
1953 comedy films
Mexican comedy films
1950s Spanish-language films
Films directed by Rafael Baledón
Mexican black-and-white films
1950s Mexican films